Apple Leisure Group (ALG) is an American travel and hospitality conglomerate focused on packaged travel and resort/brand management in Mexico, the Caribbean, Hispanic America, Europe, and the Middle East. It is the parent corporation of resort and brand management company AMResorts. ALG also oversees fourteen subsidiaries, including tour operators Apple Vacations and Travel Impressions, online travel agency CheapCaribbean.com, as well as destination management company AMStar DMC. Its headquarter is in Newtown Square, Pennsylvania. It is a subsidiary of Hyatt Hotels Corporation.

As of October 2019, ALG is also the largest seller of charter flights, providing transport to 3.2 million passengers annually from the United States to Mexico, the Dominican Republic, Jamaica, and the Caribbean.

History

Apple Vacations was founded in 1969 by John Mullen and his brother-in-law, Al Atkinson, as Atkinson & Mullen Travel. Mullen later became the sole proprietor and renamed the company Apple Vacations.

In 2001, future ALG CEO Alejandro Zozaya, son-in-law of John Mullen, founded resort sales, marketing, and brand management company AMResorts. Over a decade later, he spearheaded the effort to form ALG by making tour operator Apple Vacations a sister company of AMResorts. ALG received an influx of equity in late 2012 when it sold an undisclosed stake in its business to Boston-based global private equity firm Bain Capital. In 2013, Apple Leisure Group expanded with the acquisition of B2B tour operator Travel Impressions from American Express, of online leisure wholesaler CheapCaribbean.com, of destination management company Amstar DMC, and of AMResorts’ guest loyalty program, Unlimited Vacation Club. 

In early 2017 Bain Capital sold its interest in Apple Leisure Group to private equity companies KSL Capital Partners and KKR for an undisclosed price. In May 2018 Apple Leisure Group merged with The Mark Travel Corporation and its associated brands Funjet Vacations and Trisept Solutions under the Apple Leisure Group name.

In November of 2018, Apple Leisure Group announced an expansion into Europe alongside Groupo Inversor Hesperia (GIHSA), taking over operations of four of GIHSA’s resorts in Spain. The following month Apple Leisure Group signed an agreement to purchase a majority share in Alua Hotels and Resorts, adding a further 12 resorts across Spain to its European portfolio. Citing increased growth in the European market, in March of 2019 Apple Leisure Group named Javier Aguilla the President of the Europe Division. Aguilla had previous worked as the Founder and COO of Alua.

In 2019, ALG expanded further, adding 9,000 rooms to their portfolio over 23 different properties. This included a five-star adults-only resort, Secrets Mallorca, in the coastal town of Paguera, bringing over 100 jobs to the region. One more Secrets location is expected on the Caribbean island of St. Martin in 2020, along with a Dreams location in Punta Cana. 

Also in 2019, ALG named Alejandro Reynal as its CEO. Reynal succeeded the position from Alejandro Zozaya, who remains the leader of ALG’s board of directors. Reynal previously served as the CEO of customer relationship management conglomerate Atento.

In August 2021, Hyatt Hotels Corporation announced that it is buying Apple Leisure Group for $2.7 billion in cash. The acquisition was completed on November 2, 2021.

Subsidiaries
The subsidiaries of ALG operate under the Apple Leisure Group Vacations umbrella. Apple Leisure Group Vacations (ALGV) is a collection of vacations brands including Apple Vacations, Travel Impressions, Cheap Caribbean, Funjet Vacations, Southwest Vacations, Blue Sky Tours, BeachBound, and United Vacations.

Travel Impressions
In 1967, Arnold Tolkin purchased a travel agency called ATS. Seven years later, Tolkin formed a group incentive and convention travel company out of ATS and named it Travel Impressions. In 1998, the Tolkin family, along with partner Ira Theodore, sold the tour operator to American Express. In April 2013, American Express and ALG announced an agreement under which ALG would acquire Travel Impressions and American Express’ international tour operator American Express Vacations International (AEVI). In the agreement, Travel Impressions would become the exclusive marketer and operator of American Express Vacations. American Express permitted their American Express Vacations branding to be used by Travel Impressions under license for a 3 year period post sale of the business. However by 2017 the license agreement had expired and the program branding offered exclusively to American Express clients across Europe was changed to The Vacation Collection.

CheapCaribbean.com
Founded by Jim and Marta Hobbs and established in 2000, CheapCaribbean.com is an e-commerce vacation company providing beach travel to the Caribbean and Mexico. In August 2013, CheapCaribbean.com was acquired by Apple Leisure Group. The company continues to operate as a separate, wholly owned entity, with offices in Dallas, Phoenix, and Philadelphia. It was named one of Inc.'s "Top 5000 Fastest Growing Private Companies in America" in 2013.

Amstar DMC and Worldstar DMC
Amstar DMC has provided excursions in Mexico, Jamaica and the Dominican Republic since 1989. Its corporate headquarters are located in Cancún and Punta Cana. In 2008, Amstar became the first Mexican destination management company to open a representation office in Shanghai, China. Five years later, an office was opened in Hawaii through Amstar's sister company, Worldstar. In 2014, it commenced operation in Costa Rica.

References

1969 establishments in Pennsylvania
Hyatt Hotels and Resorts
Companies based in Delaware County, Pennsylvania
American companies established in 1969
Transport companies established in 1969
American corporate subsidiaries
Travel and holiday companies of the United States
2021 mergers and acquisitions